Robert Chilson (born 1945) is an American science fiction author. Robert was born in Oklahoma, about age six he decided to be a writer.

He was discovered by John W. Campbell and wrote many stories for Analog, including collaborations with William F. Wu.

Bibliography

Novels 
 
 The Star-Crowned Kings (1975).
 The Shores of Kansas (1976)
 Men Like Rats (1989)
 Rounded with Sleep (1990)
 Black as Blood (1998)
Isaac Asimov's Robot City series
 5. Refuge (1988)

Short fiction 

Stories

References

External links
Homepage

1945 births
Living people
20th-century American novelists
20th-century American short story writers
20th-century American male writers
American male novelists
American male short story writers
American science fiction writers
Analog Science Fiction and Fact people